Dom Mladih ("Youth Centre Skenderija") is a multifunctional venue of modern concept and interior, located in Sarajevo, Bosnia and Herzegovina, as part of Skenderija, which is equipped with state-of-the-art technology, consisting of a dance hall with a capacity of 2000 visitors and the amphitheater with a capacity of up to 600 visitors.

Many pop and rock groups as well as entertainers have started their careers as unknowns in "Dom Mladih", later to become renowned musicians throughout the region and the world: Kemal Monteno, Bijelo Dugme, Dino Merlin, Indexi, Crvena jabuka, Plavi orkestar, Ambasadori, Regina, SCH and many others.

History 

After it was damaged during Bosnian War, it was officially reopened in 2007.

References 

Centar, Sarajevo
Music venues completed in 1969
Culture in Sarajevo
Buildings and structures in Sarajevo